Edward "Ed" Thomas Mioduszewski (October 28, 1931 - September 8, 2010) was a professional American football player for the National Football League's Baltimore Colts. He played quarterback in 12 games, starting one, during the 1953 NFL season.  Mioduszewski played college football at William & Mary, where as a senior in 1952 he was named a Second-team All-American by the Associated Press.

Mioduszewski died on September 8, 2010, at the age of 78.

References

External links
NFL.com profile

1931 births
2010 deaths
American football quarterbacks
Baltimore Colts players
Cliffside Park High School alumni
People from Cliffside Park, New Jersey
Players of American football from New Jersey
Sportspeople from Bergen County, New Jersey
William & Mary Tribe football players